This is a list of state leaders in the 3rd century (201–300) AD.

Africa

Africa: East

Kingdom of Aksum (complete list) –
GDRT, King (c.200)
`DBH, King (c.230–c.240)
Sembrouthes, King (c.250)
DTWNS, King (c.260)
Endubis, King (c.270–c.300)

Africa: Northeast

Kingdom of Kush (complete list) –
Teritedakhatey, King (early 3rd century)
Aryesbokhe, King (early 3rd century)
Teqerideamani II, King (3rd century)
Talakhidamani (c. 260 / c. 300)
Maleqorobar, Prince (3rd century)
Yesbokheamani, King (c. 300)

Americas

Americas: Mesoamerica

Maya civilization

Tikal (complete list) –
Foliated Jaguar, Ajaw (2nd–3rd century)
Animal Headdress, Ajaw (c.292)

Asia

Asia: Central

Mongolia

Xianbei state –
Budugen, Chieftain (187–234)

Asia: East

China

Eastern Han, China (complete list) –
Xian, Emperor (189–220)

Cao Wei (complete list) –
Cao Pi, Emperor (220–226)
Cao Rui, Emperor (227–239)
Cao Fang, Emperor (240–249)
Cao Mao, Emperor (254–260)
Cao Huan, Emperor (260–265)

Shu Han (complete list) –
Liu Bei, Emperor (221–223)
Liu Shan, Emperor (223–263)

Eastern Wu (complete list) –
Sun Quan, Emperor (222–252)
Sun Liang, Emperor (252–258)
Sun Xiu, Emperor (258–264)
Sun Hao, Emperor (264–280)

Western Jin, China (complete list) –
Wu, Emperor  (266–290)
Hui, Emperor  (290–307)

Japan

Japan, Yayoi period (complete list) –
Previous emperors are considered legendary.
Ōjin, Emperor (270–310)

Yamatai –
Himiko, Queen (189-248)
Iyo, Queen (248–?)

Korea
Baekje (complete list) –
Chogo, King (166–214)
Gusu, King (214–234)
Saban, King (234)
Goi, King (234–286)
Chaekgye, King (286–298)
Bunseo, King (298–304)

Geumgwan Gaya (complete list) –
Geodeung, King (199–259)
Mapum, King (259–291)
Geojilmi, King (291–346)

Goguryeo (complete list) –
Sansang, King (197–227)
Dongcheon, King (227–248)
Jungcheon, King (248–270)
Seocheon, King (270–292)
Bongsang, King (292–300)
Micheon, King (300–331)

Silla (complete list) –
Naehae, King (196–230)
Jobun, King (230–247)
Cheomhae, King (247–261)
Michu, King (262–284)
Yurye, King (284–298)
Girim, King (298–310)

Asia: Southeast

Cambodia
Funan –
Fàn Shīmàn, King (early 3rd century)
Fàn Jīnshēng, King (c.230)
Fàn Zhān, King (c.230–c.243 or later)
Fàn Cháng, King (after 243)
Fàn Xún, King (c.250-287)

Indonesia: Java
Salakanagara –
Dewawarman III, King (2nd–3rd century)
Dewawarman IV, King (early 3rd century)
Dewawarman V, King (mid 3rd century)
Dewawarman VI, King (late 3rd century)

Vietnam
Champa (complete list) –
Khu Liên, King (192–mid 3rd century)
Fan Hsiung, King (c.270–280)
Fan Yi, King (c.284–336)

Asia: South

India

Chera dynasty (complete list) –
Cenkuttuvan, King (c.188–244)

Gupta Empire (complete list) –
Śri Gupta, Emperor (c.240–c.280)
Ghatotkacha, Emperor (c.280–c.319)

Kushan Empire (complete list) –
Vasudeva I, Ruler/Emperor (c.190–230s)
Kanishka II, Ruler/Emperor (c.230–240)
Vashishka, Ruler/Emperor (c.240–250)
Kanishka III, Ruler/Emperor (c.250–275)
Vasudeva II, Ruler/Emperor (c.275–310)

Satavahana dynasty (Purana-based chronology) –
Sri Yajna Satakarni, King (172–201)
Vijaya Satakarni, King (201–207)
Chandra Sri Satakarni, King (207–214)
Pulumavi IV, King (217–224)

Western Satraps (complete list) –
Rudrasena I, Satrap (200–222)
Prthivisena, Satrap (222)
Samghadaman, Satrap (222–223)
Damasena, Satrap (223–232)
Damajadasri II, Satrap (232–239)
Viradaman, Satrap (234–238)
Isvaradatta, Satrap (236–239)
Yasodaman I, Satrap (239)
Vijayasena, Satrap (239–250)
Damajadasri III, Satrap (251–255)
Rudrasena II, Satrap (255–277)
Visvasimha, Satrap (277–282)
Bhartrdaman, Satrap (282–295)
Visvasena, Satrap (293–304)

Vakataka dynasty (complete list) –
Vindhyashakti, King (250–270)
Pravarasena I, King (270–330)

Pakistan

Indo-Parthian Kingdom (complete list) –
Farn-Sasan, King (210–226)

Kushano-Sasanian Kingdom (complete list) –
Ardashir I, Kushanshah (230–245)
Peroz I, Kushanshah (245–275)
Hormizd I, Kushanshah (275–300)
Hormizd II, Kushanshah (300–303)

Paratarajas (complete list) –
Kozana, Raja (c.200–220)
Bhimarjuna, Raja (c.220–235)
Koziya, Raja (c.235–265)
Datarvharna, Raja (c.265–280)
Datayola II, Raja (c.280–300)

Sri Lanka

Anuradhapura Kingdom (complete list) –
Siri Naga I, King (196–215)
Voharika Tissa, King (215–237)
Abhaya Naga, King (237–245)
Siri Naga II, King (245–247)
Vijaya Kumara, King (247–248)
Sangha Tissa I, King (248–252)
Siri Sangha Bodhi I, King (252–254)
Gothabhaya, King (254–267)
Jettha Tissa I, King (267–277)
Mahasena, King (277–304)

Asia: West

Osroene (complete list) –	
Abgar IX, client King under Rome (177–212)	
Abgar X Severus bar Ma'nu, client King under Rome (212–214)	
Abgar (X) Severus Bar Abgar (IX) Rabo, client King under Rome (214–216)
Ma’nu (IX) Bar Abgar (X) Severus, client King under Rome (216–242)
Abgar (XI) Farhat Bar Ma’nu (IX), client King under Rome (242–244)	

Palmyra –
Odaenathus (bef. 258–267)
Zenobia Regent (267–272)
Vaballathus King (267–272)

Roman Empire: East –
Diocletian, Eastern Augustus (284–305)
Galerius, Eastern Caesar (293–311)

Persia

Persia: Sasanian Empire (complete list) –
Vologases V, Great King, Shah (191–208)
Vologases VI, Great King, Shah – in civil war (208–228)
Artabanus V, Great King, Shah – in civil war (208–224)

Adiabene (complete list) –
Shahrat (Shahrad), client King under Parthia (c.213–224)

Characene (complete list) –
Maga, client King under Parthia (c.195–210)
Abinergaos III, client King under Parthia (c.210–222)

Elymais (complete list) –
Unknown client King under Parthia (c.190–c.210)
Unknown client King under Parthia (c.210–c.220)
Orodes VI client King under Parthia (c.220–224)

Persia: Sasanian Empire (complete list) –
Ardashir I, Shahanshah, King of Kings (224–242)
Shapur I, Shahanshah, King of Kings (240–270)
Hormizd I, Shahanshah, King of Kings (270–271)
Bahram I, Shahanshah, King of Kings (271–274)
Bahram II, Shahanshah, King of Kings (274–293)
Bahram III, Shahanshah, King of Kings (293)
Narseh, Shahanshah, King of Kings (293–302)
Shapur IV,§ Shahanshah, King of Kings (420)
Khosrau the Usurper,§ Shahanshah, King of Kings (420)
Bahram V, Shahanshah, King of Kings (420–438)
Yazdegerd II, Shahanshah, King of Kings (438–457)
Hormizd III, Shahanshah, King of Kings (457–459)
Peroz I, Shahanshah, King of Kings (459–484)
Balash, Shahanshah, King of Kings (484–488)
Kavadh I, Shahanshah, King of Kings (488–496)
Djamasp, Shahanshah, King of Kings (496–498)
Kavadh I, Shahanshah, King of Kings (498–531)
Khosrow I, Shahanshah, King of Kings (531–579)
Hormizd IV, Shahanshah, King of Kings (579–590)
Khosrow II, Shahanshah, King of Kings (590)
Bahram VI Chobin,§ Shahanshah, King of Kings (590–591)
Khosrow II, Shahanshah, King of Kings (591–628)
Vistahm,§ Shahanshah, King of Kings (591–596)
Kavadh II, Shahanshah, King of Kings (628)
Ardashir III, Shahanshah, King of Kings (628–629)
Shahrbaraz,§ Shahanshah, King of Kings (629)
Khosrow III,§ Shahanshah, King of Kings (629)
Borandukht, Shahanshah, King of Kings (629–630)
Shapur-i Shahrvaraz,§ Shahanshah, King of Kings (630)
Peroz II,§ Shahanshah, King of Kings (630)
Azarmidokht, Shahanshah, King of Kings (630–631)
Farrukh Hormizd,§ Shahanshah, King of Kings (630–631)
Hormizd VI,§ Shahanshah, King of Kings (630–631)
Khosrow IV,§ Shahanshah, King of Kings (631)
Farrukhzad Khosrau V,§ Shahanshah, King of Kings (631)
Boran, Shahanshah, King of Kings (631–632)
Yazdegerd III, Shahanshah, King of Kings (632–651)

Europe

Europe: Central

Gallic Empire (complete list) –
Postumus, Emperor (260–268)
Laelianus, Emperor, usurper (268)
Marius, Emperor (268)
Victorinus, Emperor (268–270) 
Domitian II, Emperor, usurper (c.271)
Tetricus the elder, Emperor (270–274)
Tetricus the younger, Caesar (270–274)
Faustinus, Emperor, usurper (273–274)

Alamannia, tribal kingdoms (complete list) –
Chrocus, leader (fl.260–306)

Europe: East
Bosporan Kingdom (complete list) –
Sauromates II, client king under Rome (172–210)
Rhescuporis III, client king under Rome (211–228)
Cotys III, client king under Rome (228–234)
Sauromates III, client king under Rome (229–232)
Rhescuporis IV, client king under Rome (233–234)
Ininthimeus, client king under Rome (234–239)
Rhescuporis V, client king under Rome (240–276)
Pharsanzes, client king under Rome (253–254)
Teiranes, client king under Rome (276–278)
Sauromates IV, client king under Rome (276)
Theothorses, client king under Rome (279–309)

Europe: Southcentral
Roman Empire
Roman Empire (complete list) –
Septimius Severus, Emperor (193–211)
Caracalla, Emperor (198–217)
Geta, Emperor (209–211)
Macrinus, Emperor (217–218)
Diadumenian, Emperor (217–218)
Elagabalus, Emperor (218–222)
Severus Alexander, Emperor (222–235)
Maximinus I, Emperor (235–238)
Gordian I, Emperor (238–238)
Gordian II, Emperor (238–238)
Pupienus, Emperor (238–238)
Balbinus, Emperor (238–238)
Gordian III, Emperor (238–244)
Philip the Arab, Emperor (244–249)
Philip II, Emperor (247–249)
Decius, Emperor (249–251)
Herennius Etruscus, Emperor (251)
Hostilian, Emperor (251)
Trebonianus Gallus, Emperor (251–253)
Volusianus, Emperor (251–253)
Aemilianus, Emperor (253)
Valerian, Emperor (253–260)
Gallienus, Emperor (253–268)
Saloninus, Emperor (260)
Claudius Gothicus, Emperor (268–270)
Quintillus, Emperor (270)
Aurelian, Emperor (270–275)
Tacitus, Emperor (275–276)
Florian, Emperor (276)
Probus, Emperor (276–282)
Carus, Emperor (282–283)
Numerian
Caesar (282–283)
Co-Emperor (283–284)
Carinus
Caesar (282–283)
Co-Emperor (283–284)
Emperor in civil war (284–285)
Diocletian
Emperor in civil war (284–285)
Sole Emperor (285–286)
Eastern Emperor (286–305)
Maximian
Caesar (285–286)
Western Emperor (286–305)

See also: List of Roman consuls

Roman Empire: West –
Maximian, Western Augustus (286–305)
Constantius Chlorus, Western Caesar (293–306)

Eurasia: Caucasus
Armenia: Arsacid dynasty (complete list) –
Khosrov I, client King under Rome (198–217)
Tiridates II, client King under Rome (217–252)
Khosrov II, client King under Rome  (c.252)
Interregnum under Sasania 
Artavasdes IV, client King under Sasania (252–287)
Tiridates III, client King under Rome (287–330)

Kingdom of Iberia (Kartli) (complete list) –
Rev I, King (189–216)
Vache, King (216–234)
Bacurius I, King (234–249)
Mihrdat II, King (249–265)
Aspacures I, King (265–284)
Mirian III, King (284–361)

See also
List of political entities in the 3rd century

References 

Leaders
 
-